Cormano-Cusano Milanino railway station is a railway station in Italy. It serves the towns of Cormano and Cusano Milanino, being located on the border of these two municipalities.

History
The station replaced and unified the former Cormano-Brusuglio and Cusano Milanino stations, which were closed.

Services
Cormano-Cusano is served by lines S2 and S4 of the Milan suburban railway network, operated by the Lombard railway company Trenord.

See also
 Milan suburban railway network

References

External links

 Ferrovienord official site - Cormano-Cusano railway station 

Railway stations in Lombardy
Ferrovienord stations
Railway stations opened in 2015
2015 establishments in Italy
Milan S Lines stations
Railway stations in Italy opened in the 21st century